Peaster High School is a public high school located in unincorporated Peaster, Texas (USA). It is part of the Peaster Independent School District located in north central Parker County and classified as a 3A school by the UIL.    While the school is in Peaster, it has a Weatherford address.  In 2013, the school was rated "Met Standard" by the Texas Education Agency.

Athletics
The Peaster Greyhounds compete in the following sports:

Cross Country, Volleyball, Football, Basketball, Powerlifting, Golf, Tennis, Track, Softball & Baseball

State titles
Boys Basketball 
1999 (2A), 2000 (2A)

State finalists
Girls Volleyball
 2016 (3A)
Boys Basketball
2020 (3A)

References

External links
Peaster ISD

Public high schools in Texas
Schools in Parker County, Texas